Chinaman's Hat may refer to:
Conical Asian hat, a type of hat common in Asia
Chinaman's Hat (Port Phillip), an octagonal structure in the South Channel of Port Phillip, Victoria, Australia
Chinamans Hat Island, an islet in South Australia
Mokoliʻi or Chinaman's Hat, a basalt island in Kāne'ohe Bay, Hawaii
Chinaman's Hat, a rock formation on Mount Wilson, New South Wales
Sombrero Chino (Chinaman's Hat), an islet offshore of Santiago Island in the Galápagos